The Judge D. W. Gardner House, located on Kentucky Route 7 in Salyersville, Kentucky, was built in 1885.  It has also been known as Greencrest.  It was listed on the National Register of Historic Places in 1979.

It has "restrained ornamentation". It has single-story porches added about 1900.

It is a "well-known local landmark rich in local tradition and heritage because for over twenty years it served as the home of the state's circuit judge for several counties in this area. It attains added significance in being one of the few remaining older buildings in Salyersville."

References

Houses on the National Register of Historic Places in Kentucky
Houses completed in 1885
National Register of Historic Places in Magoffin County, Kentucky
Houses in Magoffin County, Kentucky
Salyersville, Kentucky
1885 establishments in Kentucky